The Bureau of Fire Protection (BFP; Filipino: Kawanihan ng Pagtatanggol sa Sunog) is the government body in the Philippines responsible for the provision of fire services. It is under the jurisdiction of the Department of the Interior and Local Government.

Functions and duties

The BFP is responsible for ensuring public safety through the prevention or suppression of all destructive fires on buildings, houses, and other similar structure, forests, and land transportation vehicles and equipment, ships/vessels docked at piers, wharves or anchored at major seaports, petroleum industry installations. It is also responsible for the enforcement of the Fire Code of the Philippines (PD 1185) and other related laws, conduct investigations involving fire incidents and causes thereof including the filing of appropriate complaints/cases.

According to its website, the primary functions of the BFP are
 Prevention and suppression of all destructive fires; 
 Enforcement of the Revised Implementing Rules and Regulations (RIRR) of the Republic Act No. 9514 otherwise known as the Fire Code of the Philippines (PD 1185) and other related laws;
 Investigate the causes of fires and if necessary, file a complaint to the city or provincial prosecutor relating to the case;
 In events of national emergency, will assist the military on the orders of the President of the Philippines;
 And establish at least one fire station with all personnel and equipment per municipality and provincial capital.

History

The BFP was formed from the units of the Integrated National Police's Office of Fire Protection Service on January 29, 1991 through Republic Act No. 6975, which created the present Interior Department and placed the provision of fire services under its control.

Republic Act No. 6975, or the Department of Interior and Local Government Act of 1990, took effect on January 1, 1991 and paved the way for the establishment of the Philippine National Police, BFP and Bureau of Jail Management and Penology as separate entities. Specifically, the Fire Bureau’s charter was created under Chapter IV (Section 53 to 59) and carried-out through the provisions of Rule VII (Sections 49 to 58) of the Implementing Rules and Regulations of the act. The organization was then placed under the direct supervision of the DILG undersecretary for peace and order. The Appropriation Act of 1991 also caused the inaugural operation of the BFP on August 2, 1991 as a distinct agency of the government, with the initial preparation of its operation plans and budget (OPB) undertaken by the staff of the Office of the National Chief Fire Marshal at Camp Crame, Quezon City headed by F/Brigadier General Ernesto Madriaga, INP (1990–1992), which took over from the long reign of F/Major Primo D. Cordeta (Ret.), the first chief fire marshal (1978–1989). Madriaga served as the BFP's first acting fire chief/director from 1991 to 1992.

In 2021, Republic Act No.11589, or the BFP Modernization Act, was enacted into law, mandating the implementation of a ten year program to modernize the BFP. The law also enabled the creation of security and protection units (SPUs) in each regional and city fire station and allowed 14 members at most per SPU to bare firearms.

Organization

The BFP has a National Headquarters, a Special Rescue/HAZMAT Unit, an Emergency Medical Services, a Special Operations Unit. an Arson Investigation Unit, the Fire Law Enforcement Service, and the Fire National Training Institute.

Each region in the Philippines has its own BFP fire region, headed by a person with the rank of fire chief superintendent (fire brigadier general) or fire senior superintendent (fire colonel).

National Headquarters 
 Office of the Chief, BFP 
 Office of the Deputy Chief for Administration 
 Office of the Deputy Chief for Operations 
 BFP Directorial Staff

Directorial Staff 
 Directorate for Intelligence and Investigation 
 Directorate for Operations 
 Directorate for Plans and Standard Development 
 Directorate for Comptrollership 
 Directorate for Fire Safety Enforcement
 Directorate for Logistics 
 Directorate for Personnel and Records Management
 Directorate for Information and Communications Management 
 Directorate for Human Resource Development

Leadership and Rank

 Commander-in-Chief: Pres. Ferdinand R. Marcos, Jr.
 Secretary of the Interior and Local Government (SILG): Sec. Benjamin Abalos Jr. 
 Undersecretary for Public Safety, DILG: Usec. Serafin P. Barretto Jr., CESO IV
 Chief, Bureau of Fire Protection (C, BFP): Fire Dir. Louie S. Puracan, CEO VI
 The Deputy Chief for Administration (TDCA): Fire C/Supt. Roel Jeremy G. Diaz 
 The Deputy Chief for Operations (TDCO): Fire C/Supt. Wilberto Rico Neil A. Kwan Tiu 
 The Chief of Directorial Staff (TDCS): Fire C/Supt. Jesus P. Fernandez

Commissioned officers 
As of 2021, BFP ranks are equivalent to those in the army.

Fire Director (Major General)
Fire Chief Superintendent (Brigadier General)
Fire Senior Superintendent (Colonel)
Fire Superintendent (Lieutenant Colonel)
Fire Chief Inspector (Major)
Fire Senior Inspector (Captain)
Fire Inspector (1st Lieutenant)

Non-commissioned officers 
Senior Fire Officer 4 (Executive Master Sergeant)
Senior Fire Officer 3 (Chief Master Sergeant)
Senior Fire Officer 2 (Senior Master Sergeant)
Senior Fire Officer 1 (Master Sergeant)
Fire Officer 3 (Staff Sergeant)
Fire Officer 2 (Corporal)
Fire Officer 1 (Firefighter)

Non-Uniformed Personnel refers to all BFP civilian personnel and employees having no rank. Civil service employees carry their civil service grade.

Equipment

The bureau provides fire fighting vehicles depending on the jurisdiction's capabilities. Each city and municipality in the Philippines has one to four such vehicles in their inventories at a minimum.

See also
Philippine National Police
Bureau of Jail Management and Penology

References

External links

Fire departments of the Philippines
Government agencies of the Philippines
Department of the Interior and Local Government (Philippines)